Diego Gonçalves (born 22 September 1994), sometimes known as just Diego, is a Brazilian professional footballer who plays as a forward for Goiás, on loan from Mirassol.

Club career
Born in Guarujá, São Paulo, Diego Gonçalves played for AA Ponte Preta and Fluminense FC's youth systems, after starting it out at seven-a-side football with Gamma Esportes and AE Barra Funda. On 21 July 2013 he moved abroad for the first time in his career, joining Portuguese side S.C. Olhanense.

Diego Gonçalves made his professional debut on 17 August 2013, starting in a 0–2 away loss against Vitória S.C. in the Primeira Liga. He was regularly used under manager Abel Xavier, but after the arrival of Paulo Alves, he lost his starting spot and rescinded his link on 27 November.

On 26 January 2014 Diego Gonçalves went on a trial at Atlético Clube de Portugal, signing a contract shortly after. He left the side at the end of the campaign, after appearing sparingly.

On 5 January 2015 Diego Gonçalves signed for Portuguesa, freshly relegated to Série C. He made his debut for the club on 1 February, starting and scoring the first in a 3–2 away win against Ponte Preta for the Campeonato Paulista championship.

On 1 December 2015, Diego Gonçalves renewed his contract with Lusa for a further year. On 11 July 2016, however, he was released, and subsequently joined Internacional; initially assigned to the B-team, he was promoted to the main squad on 8 October by manager Celso Roth.

Diego Gonçalves made his Série A debut on 6 November 2016, replacing Aylon in a 0–1 away loss against Palmeiras.

References

External links

Olhanense profile 

1994 births
Living people
People from Guarujá
Brazilian footballers
Association football forwards
Campeonato Brasileiro Série A players
Campeonato Brasileiro Série B players
Campeonato Brasileiro Série C players
Associação Portuguesa de Desportos players
Sport Club Internacional players
Primeira Liga players
Liga Portugal 2 players
S.C. Olhanense players
Atlético Clube de Portugal players
Paraná Clube players
Ventforet Kofu players
J2 League players
Associação Ferroviária de Esportes players
Londrina Esporte Clube players
Botafogo Futebol Clube (SP) players
Figueirense FC players
Mirassol Futebol Clube players
Botafogo de Futebol e Regatas players
Goiás Esporte Clube players
Brazilian expatriate footballers
Brazilian expatriate sportspeople in Portugal
Expatriate footballers in Portugal
Footballers from São Paulo (state)